Audrey O'Flynn  is an Ireland women's rugby sevens international. O'Flynn represented Ireland at the 2018 Rugby World Cup Sevens. O'Flynn is also a former Ireland women's field hockey international. Between 2010 and 2014, O'Flynn made 120 appearances and scored 30 goals for the Ireland women's national field hockey team

Early years, family and education
Between 1999 and 2004 O'Flynn attended Mount Mercy College, Cork. Between 2004 and 2010 she attended University College Cork where she gained a Bachelor of Commerce and Master of Science in Corporate Finance. Her hometown is Dripsey. She is a cousin of Mick O'Driscoll.

Field hockey

UCC
O'Flynn was a member of the University College Cork teams that won the intervarsity tournament, the Chilean Cup, in 2006 and 2007. O'Flynn was captain of the UCC team during the 2009–10 season. O'Flynn was a UCC player when she made her senior debut for Ireland.

Hermes
Between 2010 and 2014 O'Flynn played for Hermes in the Women's Irish Hockey League. In 2010–11 she was a member of the Hermes team that played in the Irish Senior Cup final, losing 3–1 to Pegasus. O'Flynn also played and scored twice for Hermes in the 2012 Women's EuroHockey Club Champion's Challenge I final, defeating Lille Metropole 3–1.

Ireland international
Between 2010 and 2014 O'Flynn made 120 appearances and scored 30 goals for Ireland. 
O'Flynn played at Ireland A level  before she made her senior debut for Ireland against Belgium in February 2010. At the 2012 Women's Field Hockey Olympic Qualifier, O'Flynn was a prominent member of the Ireland team that finished as runners up to Belgium. Despite breaking her jaw during a game against Spain, O'Flynn finished the tournament as topscorer, after scoring eight goals in five matches, all from penalty corners. Following her performance in this tournament, O'Flynn was subsequently named The Irish Times/ Irish Sports Council Sportswoman of the Month for March 2012. She was also voted the Ireland Women's Player's Player of the Year for 2012. O'Flynn made her 100th appearance for Ireland during a series of games against Spain in  January 2014. In August 2014, during a game against France,  O'Flynn scored a quartet of goals from penalty corners.

Rugby sevens

Ireland international
In December 2014 it was announce that O'Flynn had signed a professional contract with the IRFU to play for the  Ireland women's national rugby sevens team. She made her debut at the 2015 Rugby Europe Women's Sevens Grand Prix Series. In the absence of regular captain, Lucy Mulhall, O'Flynn has captained the Ireland Sevens.

Honours

Field hockey
Ireland
Women's Field Hockey Olympic Qualifier
Runners Up: 2012
Hermes
Women's Irish Hockey League
Runners Up: 2010–11 ? 
Irish Senior Cup
Runners Up: 2010–11
Women's EuroHockey Club Champion's Challenge I
Winners: 2012
UCC
Chilean Cup
Winners: 2006, 2007
Individual 
The Irish Times/ Irish Sports Council Sportswoman of the Month
 March 2012 
Ireland Women's Player's Player of the Year
 2012

Rugby sevens
Ireland
Rugby Europe Women's Sevens Grand Prix Series
Runners Up: 2017

References

1987 births
Living people
Ireland international women's field hockey players
Irish female field hockey players
Irish schoolteachers
Ireland international women's rugby sevens players
Alumni of University College Cork
Rugby union players from County Cork
Sportspeople from County Cork
Women's Irish Hockey League players